Snacktime! is a children's-themed studio album by Canadian band Barenaked Ladies released on May 6, 2008 by Desperation Records. A companion book was written with artwork by multi-instrumentalist Kevin Hearn, who also contributed artwork for the album. It is the final Barenaked Ladies album to include Steven Page, who departed the band on February 25, 2009. He was subsequently quoted, saying of the album, "[i]t was a lot of fun to do, but it wasn't my idea. I was along for the ride."

Snacktime! reached number 10 on the Canadian charts and peaked at  61 on the Billboard 200. It also won a 2009 Juno Award for the Children's Album of the Year.

Track listing

"Snacktime" guest callers
The first song in the Canadian Snacktime Trilogy, entitled "Snacktime", features numerous guest callers stating their favourite snack. Some of these callers are celebrities while others are children of the band. Some of the celebrities and children with their respective snacks of choice are listed below, in order of appearance.

 Geddy Lee, barbecue potato chips
 Jonah Page, marshmallows
 Harland Williams, blueberry pie
 Finn Creeggan, crackers
 Lyle Lovett, watermelon
 Hazel Stewart, nori
 Sarah McLachlan, chocolate
 Ben Page, 3 lb lobster
 Martin Tielli, olives
 Hannah Robertson, salt & vinegar chips
 David Suzuki, sembei
 Jason Priestley, macaroni & cheese
 Arden Robertson, popcorn
 Gord Downie, peanut butter & crackers
 Isaac Page, ice cream
 Mike Smith (as Bubbles), pickled eggs
 Mili Stewart (Tyler's daughter), Cheezies
 "Weird Al" Yankovic, honey roasted peanuts
 Lyle Robertson, jellybeans
 Janeane Garofalo, microwaved chocolate doughnuts
 Kevin Hearn (as Zignon Five), microchips
 Gordon Lightfoot, pasta

The trilogy concept is influenced by the song "Canadian Railroad Trilogy" (1966) by Canadian singer-songwriter Gordon Lightfoot.

References

Barenaked Ladies albums
2008 albums
Children's music albums by Canadian artists
Albums produced by Michael Phillip Wojewoda
Juno Award for Children's Album of the Year albums
Concept albums